KKB may refer to:

 KKB, a 70's American rock band, featuring future KISS lead   Bruce Kulick
 Kero Kero Bonito, an English indie pop band
 Kumkum Bhagya, an Indian soap opera
 Basel Boys Choir
 Kitoi Bay Seaplane Base, Kodiak Island, Alaska, United States
 Kuala Kubu Bharu, Selangor, Malaysia
 Kouadio Konan Bertin, an Ivorian politician
 Kagoshima Broadcasting, a Japanese commercial TV station